The D.C. College Cup, officially known as the Kuykenstrong D.C. College Cup for sponsorship reasons, was an early season, non-conference college soccer tournament played between the NCAA Division I men's soccer programs in the Washington metropolitan area.

The teams that participated in the past include American, George Mason, George Washington, Georgetown, Howard and Maryland.

Results

References

External links 
 Official Website (archived, 25 Mar 2016)

College soccer tournaments in the United States
Recurring sporting events established in 2001